Kurnad is a village in Bantwal taluk, Dakshina Kannada district, Karnataka, India.  the 2011 Census of India, it had a population of 2,718 across 571 households.

References 

Villages in Dakshina Kannada district